St. Joseph's Episcopal Church may refer to:

in the United States
(by state)
 Saint Joseph's Episcopal Church, 1883 (Detroit, Michigan), listed on the NRHP in Michigan
 Saint Joseph's Episcopal Church, 1926 (Detroit, Michigan), listed on the NRHP in Michigan
 St. Joseph's Episcopal Church (Durham, North Carolina)
St. Joseph's African Methodist Episcopal Church, Durham, North Carolina, listed on the NRHP in Durham County, North Carolina
 St. Joseph's Episcopal Church (Fayetteville, North Carolina), listed on the NRHP in Cumberland County, North Carolina